Samurai is the fifth studio album by Die Apokalyptischen Reiter. The release had two versions, the international version, and the U.S. version which had the band name changed to "The Apocalyptic Riders" and has a slightly different cover with a different track listing as well. It was also released as a box set, limited to 1000 copies, which contained the CD, a patch, a flag and a DVD with four video clips, band documentary and a hidden track.

Track listing

  "Wahnsinn" – 3:05
  "Eruption" – 4:09
  "Rock'n'Roll" – 1:57
  "Silence of Sorrow" – 3:52
  "Der Teufel" – 5:15
  "Reitermaniacs" – 5:46
  "Barmherzigkeit" – 3:29
  "Per Aspera ad Astra" – 4:31
  "Lazy Day" – 3:12
  "Die Sonne Scheint" – 3:09
  "Roll my Heart" – 2:38
  "Hey-Ho" – 3:58
  "Northern Lights" - 3:18

U.S. track listing
  "Silence of Sorrow" – 3:32
  "Rock'n'Roll" – 1:57
  "Hey-Ho" – 3:58
  "Wahnsinn" – 3:05
  "Eruption" – 4:09
  "Der Teufel" – 5:15
  "Reitermaniacs" – 5:46
  "Barmherzigkeit" – 3:29
  "Per Aspera ad Astra" – 4:31
  "Lazy Day" – 3:12
  "Die Sonne Scheint" – 3:09
  "Roll my Heart" – 2:38
  "Northern Lights" - 3:18

Credits 

 Fuchs (aka Eumel - Daniel Täumel) - vocals, guitar
 Pitrone - guitar
 Dr. Pest (Mark Szakul) - keyboards, synthesizers
 Volk-Man - bass guitar, vocals
 Sir G. (Georg Lenhardt) - drums

References

Die Apokalyptischen Reiter albums
2004 albums